Robert Grimes Davis (May 10, 1819 – March 4, 1872) was an early lawyer and judge of the Kingdom of Hawaii who served many different posts for Hawaii and the Republic of Peru. He was also known as Lopaka, the Hawaiian version of Robert.

Life
Davis was born in 1819, in Honolulu to Captain William Heath Davis, Sr. and Hannah Holmes Davis, a daughter of Oliver Holmes, Governor of Oahu. His father, who arrived in Hawaii in 1812, was a Boston ship captain and one of the pioneer merchants of the sandalwood trade in the islands. He was given his middle name after Captain Eliab Grimes, a close friend of his father who was also once a privateer in the War of 1812. His younger brother was William Heath Davis, Jr., who was an early settler of San Diego. Davis and his younger brother were one-quarter Hawaiian from their maternal grandmother Mahi Kalanihooulumokuikekai, a high chiefess from the Koolau district of Oahu. After his father's death on November 26, 1822, Hannah Holmes remarried to another American merchant John Coffin Jones, who took the five-year-old Davis back to Boston in 1825. In the United States, he was given "a classical education" and raised in the household of an uncle who was a wealthy merchant in Boston, remaining there until he completed his schooling. He traveled for a time in Europe where he acquired the ability to speak French, Spanish and German. For a time, he was a clerk on the Boston merchant ship Monsoon which traded in Monterrey and Yerba Buena (now San Francisco). He returned to Honolulu and went into the mercantile business, trading between Hawaii and California.

In 1850, Davis was appointed Peruvian Consul General to Hawaii by President Ramón Castilla succeeding James F. B. Marshall, who had resigned. He would hold this position for much of the 1850s. Davis resigned his post as Peruvian Consul upon his appointment as Police Magistrate of Honolulu in 1859.
Davis also served many governmental posts for the Kingdom of Hawaii. He served as Commission of Customs in 1853, Police Magistrate of Honolulu in 1859 and briefly served as a member of the House of Representatives, the lower house of the Hawaiian legislature, during the session of 1855. He was also a member of the Privy Council from 1863 to 1865 under the reign of Kamehameha V. 
In 1852, he began studying law and shortly after became a well read lawyer. He also was appointed to succeed John Papa ʻĪʻī as the Second Associate Justice of the Supreme Court of Hawaii from February 16, 1864, until his resignation on July 8, 1868. Serving alongside Chief Justice Elisha Hunt Allen and First Associate Justice George Morison Robertson, the effectiveness of the three men's terms in office were considered highly by their contemporaries. In 1873, a writer in the Hawaiian newspaper The Advertiser stated:
The years during which the Bench was occupied by the present Chief Justice with Judges Robertson and Davis as Associates, may justly be regarded as comprising me most satisfactory period in the history of our jurisprudence. These three legal minds, not each excelling in just the same points, combined to give us a Bench of a Court of law. The decisions of the full Court were then the decisions of three legal men, and were settled and founded on legal argument and authorities. In proof of this statement, it is satisfactory to know that the dicta of our Court during that period have been more than once quoted m foreign forums.
During his time in office, he would also published Volume II of Hawaiian Law Reports.
Between 1868 and 1869, after his term as Associate Justice, Davis and Richard H. Stanley served on a commission which compiled and translated the Penal Code of the Hawaiian Kingdom into Hawaiian and English.

Davis married on March 23, 1843, to his cousin Harriet Swain Hammett (died 1858), daughter of Captain Charles H. Hammatt (spelling varied) and Charlotte Holmes, with whom he had four children Elizabeth J., William Heath, Charles Hammett, and Charlotte Holmes Lelepoki Davis.
He married secondly on August 1, 1862, to Maria Sumner Sea (1824–1908), daughter of Captain William Sumner and the widow of Henry Sea, with whom he had Maria and Robert Crichton Wyllie "Wally" Davis. His daughter Charlotte married James A. King making Davis the grandfather of Samuel Wilder King, who became Governor of the Territory of Hawaii 1953–1957 and was the first person of Native Hawaiian descent to become governor.

He died on March 4, 1872, in Honolulu after suffering for several months from the dropsy. After his death, Davis was buried at Oahu Cemetery.

References

Bibliography
 
 
 
 
 
 
 

 
 
 
 
 
 
 
 
 

1819 births
1872 deaths
Native Hawaiian politicians
Members of the Hawaiian Kingdom House of Representatives
Members of the Hawaiian Kingdom Privy Council
Justices of the Hawaii Supreme Court
Hawaiian Kingdom judges
Peruvian diplomats
People from Honolulu
19th-century American judges
Burials at Oahu Cemetery